Peter Murnik (born December 14, 1965) is an American actor known for roles in Justified, JAG, Pensacola: Wings of Gold, Martial Law, and ER. He also had a role in the 1998 movie Hard Rain.

Early life and education 
Murnik was born in Concord, Massachusetts. He attended Boston University.

Career 
Murnik is known for his role as Lt. Martel in the two-part Seinfeld episode "The Trip". He investigated a murder case in Los Angeles and arrested Kramer as the serial killer, but eventually let him go after a long interrogation that put Kramer in tears. He was a main star in the BYUtv series, Granite Flats.

Filmography

Film

Television

References

External links

1965 births
Living people
American male film actors
American male television actors
Male actors from Massachusetts
People from Concord, Massachusetts